Lappmarken was an earlier Swedish name for the northern part of the old Kingdom of Sweden inhabited by the Sami people. In addition to the present-day Swedish Lapland, it also covered Västerbotten, Jämtland and Härjedalen, as well as the Finnish Lapland. As a name, it is related to Finnmark, an old Norwegian name for the Sami area. "Finn" and "Lapp" are mutually exchangeable old names for the Sami people, although the latter is sometimes deemed offensive.

Already in the Middle Ages, Lappmarken consisted of "lappmarks" whose Sami people were loosely governed either by the crown or birkarls. The purpose of lappmarks was largely colonial in nature. Originally, each consisted of a river valley with its surrounding areas from the Gulf of Bothnia up to the fjelds. The first lappmarks were:

 Lycksele lappmark (Ume River valley)
 Åsele lappmark (Ångerman River valley)
 Tornio lappmark (Tornio River valley)
 Piteå lappmark (Pite River valley)
 Luleå lappmark (Lule River valley)
 Kemi lappmark (Kemi River valley, separated from Tornio lappmark in 1633)

State took Lappmarken to tighter control in the 17th century with the downfall of the birkarl system and establishment of the state controlled towns. County of Norrland was established in 1634 for the state administration on the region while the parallel concept of Lappmarken continued to regulate the Sami people and their relations with the settlers.

Lappmark Proclamation in 1673 stipulated that anybody who settled in the Sami region would be granted tax exemption for 15 years and would not have to serve as a soldier in any war. Since Sami people contributed significantly to the public treasury, the settlers were allowed only to colonise land that was considered "unused".

The proclamation was renewed in 1695. Sami people heavily protested against it, but in vain. Sami people were de facto forced to leave large areas and retreat northwards. Individual taxes were also removed from the Sami people, and their taxes were put on the Sami villages. This system was in place until 1928.

Lappmark Regulation in 1749 ordered settlers to stay away from hunting and devote themselves to farming and the keeping of livestock. The colonial rights were now also opened up to the Sami people. Two years later, Västerbotten was separated from Lappmarken and its inhabitants were forbidden to hunt or fish in the Sami area. By now the then Lappmarken was also known as Lappland.

In the 19th century, with the loss of Kemi and Tornio lappmarks along with Finland in 1809 and further retreat of the Sami people, Lappmarken gradually lost its purpose. The remaining area was incorporated to the general state administration in the early 20th century. However, the name "lappmark" still bears a legal meaning and is widely used in the Sami related legislation in Sweden.

See also 
 Sápmi (the larger traditional territory of the Sámi, often mistakenly called "Lappland")

References
 
 
 
 Sköld, Peter; Samerna och deras historia (1993), ISSN 0283-9717 (Swedish)
 Nationalencykolpedin - a swedish major encyclopedia
 Nordisk familjebok, 3rd ed., Vol. XII (1929)

Sápmi